Juan Pablo Brzezicki and David Marrero were the defending champions, but Brzezicki chose to not participate this year.
Marrero partnered up with Santiago Ventura and they won in the final 7–6(3), 6–4, against Uladzimir Ignatik and Martin Kližan.

Seeds

Draw

Draw

External links
 Doubles Draw

Citta di Caltanissetta - Doubles
Città di Caltanissetta